Abney and Abney Grange is a civil parish in the Derbyshire Dales district of Derbyshire, England.  It covers the villages of Abney and Abney Grange.

Notable residents
William Newton, poet, was born near Abney at Cockey Farm.

References

Civil parishes in Derbyshire